KLXK is a commercial radio station located in Breckenridge, Texas, broadcasting to the areas northeast of Abilene, Texas. KLXK airs a country music format branded as "K-Lakes".

References

External links
K Lakes Country Facebook

 

Country radio stations in the United States
LXK
Radio stations established in 1984
1984 establishments in Texas